Parke's Castle (also known as Newtown Castle and O'Rourke's Castle) is a plantation-era castle situated on the northeast shore of Lough Gill in the north of County Leitrim in the northern part of Connacht, the western province in Ireland. The castle is built on the site of an earlier fifteenth-century O'Rourke (Uí Ruairc) tower house. The building came into the possession of Robert Parke in late 1628. By 1635, Parke had completed his fortified manor house on the site of the older Gaelic castle.

The Parke family had died out by the late 1670s, and the manor house was last lived in around 1700. The building quickly became a ruin and remained uninhabited for over 300 years. The bawn was used as a farmyard by the residents of Newtown village. The building was acquired by the Office of Public Works in 1935.

Excavations directed by Claire Foley between 1971 and 1975 revealed the foundations of O'Rourke's tower house and a number of other structures within the bawn. The castle was restored and refurbished between 1980 and 1988, and has been open to the public on a seasonal basis since 1990.

History

O'Rourke's Castle
The Annals of Lough Cé first mention O'Rourke's tower house at Baile Nua (New Town or Newtown) in 1546, when "great treachery was practiced by the sons of Alexander MacCabe against O'Ruairc in his own Town i.e. Baile Nua, his castle in the Barony of Drumahaire". A roughly circular rock-cut ditch with an opening to the east is probably the oldest feature of the site, and may predate the tower house by some time. The material excavated from the moat provided limestone to build a pentagonal bawn wall within the enclosure. More building materials for both Duroy Castle and Newtown Castle would have been quarried in Cartron Glen close by. The tower house probably dates from 1450 to 1500, and was one of several residences belonging to the ruler of West Breifne, Sir Brian O'Rourke.

During his rebellion against the Crown, O'Rourke damaged or "slighted" Newtown Castle in 1581 to make it unusable by the English. He also demolished his castles at Dromahair and Leitrim at this time. O'Rourke was knighted in 1585 but continued to defy the Crown, sheltering at least eighty Spanish sailors who had been shipwrecked at Streedagh in 1588.

Accused of high treason, O'Rourke was attacked in Breifne from three directions. He fled his territory, travelling first to Doe Castle in the north of County Donegal in the north-west of Ulster, where he remained for a year. He then travelled to the Kingdom of Scotland, where he attempted to raise an army of gallowglass soldiers to help him reclaim his kingdom. Sir Brian O'Rourke was eventually arrested on the orders of King James VI, who refused to give him an audience. O'Rourke was extradited to London, where, after a period in the Tower of London, he was hung, drawn and quartered for high treason in London on 3 November 1591."

His son and successor, Brian Og O'Rourke, inherited his title and continued his father's struggle against English invasion. O'Rourke harboured many Irish lords during the Nine Years' War and his castle in North Leitrim was the destination for O'Sullivan Beare's infamous march from the Beara Peninsula in the winter of 1602. O'Sullivan arrived with only thirty followers; nearly 1,000 of his kingdom's men, women and children had died on the journey. Little is known of any activities at Newtown Castle during this period.

Robert Parke's Castle
The plantation of Leitrim took place in the 1620, with half the county used to pay soldiers for the service during the Nine Years' War, when many large grants were made to favourite courtiers of King James I. The land at Newtown was initially granted to Sir William Irving, a member of the Privy Council, who passed the property over to Sir John Spottiswood. Robert and William Parke, natives of Kent, were related to Roger Jones, a well-connected business man, and Jones brought his young nephews with him to Sligo in 1606. Robert Parke had acquired the site of  O'Rourke's castle at Newtown and 1000 acres of land by November 1628. William came into possession of the O'Rourke castle at Dromahair around the same time.

Robert Parke demolished the remains of O'Rourke's tower house at Newtown, recycling the stones to build the gate tower around 1630 followed by the manor house, which appears to have been completed by 1635. The earlier ditch surrounding the site was filled in with rubble, and Parke had a pair of defensive towers constructed on the north corners of the bawn wall. A pair of sentry turrets and a sally port, or water gate were added to the south wall. The height of the bawn walls were increased, and gun loops were added along the tops of the walls. Parke, having demolished the earlier tower house, had the interior of the bawn paved with cobbles, which removed any traces of the earlier Gaelic castle.

Parke appears to have prospered at Newtown, acquiring more land by the end of the 1630s, and having enough resources to lend money to other settlers. He employed many Irish workers on his lands, and kept a harper, Dermond O'Farry in his residence.

1641 Rebellion 
Robert Parke, who became MP for Roscommon in 1641, was considered to be a man of standing, importance and influence in the north Connaught region. However, he had a difficult time during the Rebellion which broke out in Ulster in the autumn of 1641, when he attempted to remain neutral and carry on as normal, hoping the uprising would soon be over.

Sir Fredrick Hamilton, a  Scottish soldier and planter who had built his castle at Manorhamilton (Irish: Cluainín Uí Ruairc) in 1635, was outraged by Parke's behaviour and lack of vigour in suppressing the rebellion. Hamilton, who was keen to crush the remnants of the O'Rourke's, had been besieged on a number of occasions in his own castle. Observing that Parke seemed to be under no threat and indeed was possibly collaborating with the Irish, Hamilton burned the village at Newtown in the spring of 1642."A week or so after Easter, Sir Fredrick, with a party of horse and foot, burned some villages and killed a number of rebels two miles from Sligo town. He returned home via Newtown Castle and village, which he noticed had not been attacked at all by the insurgents. He was then informed that the rebels' cows had been allowed to graze right up to the bawn walls of the castle, without any interference by Robert Parke and his sixty-strong garrison, even while Manorhamilton was blockaded. Moreover, the Irish apparently passed freely by Parke's castle, with provisions from Sligo town, on their way to their camp at Cornastauk. So Hamilton decided there and then to burn Newtown village, which 'so long had relieved and sheltered the rogues', and to put some of the inhabitants to the sword. As for Parke himself, he would be made to answer for his collusion with the rebels on another occasion." Hamilton returned to Parke's residence, arriving at midnight on July 1, 1642. When the reluctant Parke finally admitted Hamilton to the castle, he was ordered to assemble his garrison in the courtyard. Hamilton then arrested Parke in front of his own soldiers, and forced him and a contingent of the Newtown garrison to accompany Hamilton on a dawn raid on Sligo town. Hamilton boasted that 300 rebels were put to the sword and the town burned during the raid.  Parke was taken to Manorhamilton where Hamilton kept him prisoner for 18 months in his castle, ignoring a number of directives from the government to release the MP. When a year-long truce was declared, Parke was eventually released while Hamilton was away in Derry. During the twenty-one months of the rebellion, at least 150 refugees were living at Parke's Castle (also known as Newtown Castle).

Parke's Castle (or Newtown Castle) was held by Parliamentarian forces, who surrendered the building to The 1st Marquess of Clanrickard on July 10, 1649. It is not clear if Robert Parke was resident in Newtown Castle at this time. In May 1652, Irish Royalist forces attacked, looted and burned the castle in Manorhamilton, effectively destroying its use as a fortification. Parke's Castle, occupied by Irish Royalists led by Donough O'Hart, was surrendered to Confederate forces led by Charles Coote on June 3, 1652; it seems certain that from this time on Parke was back resident in his castle at Newtown.

Later History 

Robert Parke was married to Roscommon woman Ann Povey, and they had three children; Ann, Robert (b. 1661) and Maggie (b. 1663). The name given to the estate by the Parke family was Newtown Castle, and they made it their permanent residence. Robert Parke died in the autumn of 1671, and his wife Ann seems to have died shortly afterwards. Tragedy befell the remaining family when Maggie and Robert drowned while boating on Lough Gill in 1677, leaving Ann as the sole heiress. Ann married Sir Francis Gore and went to live with him in County Sligo, allowing the castle to fall into disrepair following her parents’ deaths.

The manor house was uninhabited for three centuries while the bawn was used as a farmyard by the residents of Newtown village. The site came into State ownership in 1935 and was used as a storage depot by the Office of Public Works.

Restoration & Layout
In 1971, while installing a toilet in the building, a ditch was dug through the courtyard which revealed the base of the original O'Rourke tower house beneath the courtyard cobbles. The site was excavated between 1971 and 1975, revealing the foundations of a number of buildings within the bawn walls, the well and the enclosing rock-cut ditch. 

The castle had extensive and sensitive restoration carried out between 1980 and 1988, undertaken by the Office of Public Works. The window glazing was reinstated, and local artisans restored the spiral timber stair and the mortise and tenon oak roof, using carpentry techniques of the 17th century.

The walls of the original bawn were a spacious pentagonal defensive area, with the O'Rourke tower house placed in the centre of the courtyard. The stones of O’Rourke's tower were used to build the three-storey manor on the eastern side, eventually adorned with mullioned windows and diamond-shaped chimneys. One of two round flankers guarding the north side of the bawn forms one end of the manor. The other end has the gate building with an arched entrance leading into the enclosure. Inside the courtyard are many stone work buildings and a covered well. There is also a postern gate and a sally port.

Location and access 
Parke's Castle is located 7 kilometres (5 miles) north-west of Dromahair on the Sligo road (R286) and 11 km (7 miles) from Sligo. The restored castle is managed by the OPW, and is open to the public on a seasonal basis. The castle is open from late March to November in 2021. An admission fee is charged to visit, and guided tours are available.

Five hundred meters south-east of Parke's Castle lie the remains of Castle Duroy (from the Irish Dubhshraith), another former stronghold of the Ó Ruairc clan. The ruins of Castle Duroy sit on a small peninsula which juts out into Lough Gill. Very little of this castle now remains above ground. The site of Castle Duroy is on the northern shore of Lough Gill, just off the main Sligo to Dromahair road (the R286).

References

External links
 Leitrim County Council
 LeitrimTourism.com

Archaeological sites in County Leitrim
Castles in County Leitrim
Houses completed in 1610
National Monuments in County Leitrim
Historic house museums in the Republic of Ireland
Museums in County Leitrim
1610 establishments in Ireland